Mircea Ciobanu (born Mircea Sandu ; May 13, 1940 in Bucharest – April 22, 1996 in Bucharest) was a Romanian poet, writer, editor, translator and essayist.

He is best remembered for his two volumes of interviews with HM King Michael I of Romania (a book widely reprinted by various editors in the early 1990s, later reunited in a single volume by "Humanitas" Publishing House), that offers the most complete insight in the King's political and personal way of thinking, to date.

Published works
 Imnuri pentru nesomnul cuvintelor, E. P. L., Bucharest, 1966
 Patimile, Editura Tineretului, Bucharest, 1968
 Martorii, E. P. L., Bucharest, 1968
 Epistole I, E. P. L., Bucharest, 1968
 Cartea fiilor, Editura Cartea Românească, Bucharest, 1970, 2nd edition at Editura Vitruviu, Bucharest, 1998
 Etica, Editura Albatros, Bucharest, 1971
 Armura lui Thomas si alte epistole, Editura Eminescu, Bucharest, 1971
 Martorii, 2nd edition, completely revised, 1973
 Tăietorul de lemne, Editura Cartea Românească, Bucharest, 1974
 Cele ce sînt, Editura Eminescu, Bucharest, 1974
 Istorii, vol. I, Editura Eminescu, Bucharest, 1977, 2nd edition at Editura Vitruviu, Bucharest, 1999 
 Istorii, vol. II, Editura Cartea Românească, Bucharest, 1978, 2nd edition at Editura Vitruviu, Bucharest, 1999 
 Patimile, Editura Cartea Românească, Bucharest, 1979
 Istorii, vol. III, Editura Eminescu, Bucharest, 1981, 2nd edition at Editura Vitruviu, Bucuharest, 1999
 Versuri, Editura Eminescu, Bucharest, 1982
 Istorii, vol. IV, Editura Cartea Românească, Bucharest, 1983
 Vîntul Ahab, Editura Eminescu, Bucharest, 1984. 
 Marele scrib, Albatros, "Cele mai frumoase poezii" collection ("The Most Beautiful Poems"), Bucharest, 1985
 Istorii, vol. V, Editura Eminescu, Bucharest, 1986
 Martorii. Epistole. Tăietorii de lemne, Editura Minerva, Bucharest, 1988
 Viața lumii, Editura Cartea Românească, Bucharest, 1989
 Nimic fără Dumnezeu. Convorbiri cu Mihai I al României (Nothing Without God. Talks With Michael I of Romania), Humanitas, Bucharest, 1992 - vol. I
 Nimic fără Dumnezeu. Noi convorbiri cu Mihai I al României (Nothing Without God. New Talks With Michael I of Romania), Humanitas, Bucharest, 1993 - vol. II
 Tînărul bogat (vol. VI from Istorii), Editura Cartea Românească, Bucharest, 1993 
 Poeme, Editura Princeps, Iași, 1994
 În fața neamului meu (In Front of My Nation), Editura Princeps, Iași, 1995, 
 La capătul puterilor. Însemnări pe Cartea lui Iov, Editura Vitruviu, București, 1997
 Anul tăcerii, Editura Vitruviu, București, 1997
 Convorbiri cu Regele Mihai I al României (Talks with King Michael of Romania), Humanitas, 2004, 3rd edition,  (reunites vol. I and vol. II)
 Convorbiri cu Mihai I al României (Talks with Michael I of Romania), Humanitas, 2008, 3rd edition,  (reunites vol. I and vol. II)

References

 Streiflicht – Eine Auswahl zeitgenössischer rumänischer Lyrik (81 rumänische Autoren), - "Lumina piezișă", antologie bilingvă cuprinzând 81 de autori români în traducerea lui Christian W. Schenk, Dionysos Verlag 1994, 
 Eugen Simion, Scriitori români de azi, vol. I, Editura Cartea Româneascǎ, 1974 (ediția I), 1978 (ed. a doua, revăzută / augm.).
 Isabela Vasiliu-Scraba, MIRCEA CIOBANU - Poet din vremea lui Ahab, vezi http://asymetria-anticariat.blogspot.ro/2014/08/izabela-vasiliu-scraba-mircea-ciobanu.html  .
 Mircea Zaciu, Marian Papahagi, Aurel Sassu, Dicționarul scriitorilor români, A-C, Editura Fundației Culturale Române, fisa de Elena Tacciu (n. 1933, din 1991 in Israel), 1995 
Cristina Cioabă, Identitate și disoluție: introducere în opera lui Mircea Ciobanu - București, Universitatea București, Facultatea de Litere, 2006. - 337 p. ; 30 cm. - Teza de doctorat, Ed. Muzeul Literaturii Romane, 2010. Coord. prof. univ. dr. Paul Cornea.

Romanian biographers
Male biographers
Romanian essayists
Romanian poets
Romanian male poets
1940 births
1996 deaths
20th-century essayists